Jan Wallén (born 6 June 1935) is a Swedish former sports shooter. He competed in the 25 metre pistol event at the 1960 Summer Olympics.

References

External links
 

1935 births
Living people
Swedish male sport shooters
Olympic shooters of Sweden
Shooters at the 1960 Summer Olympics
Sportspeople from Skåne County